Enquatrovirus is a genus of bacteriophages in the order Caudovirales, in the family Podoviridae. Bacteria serve as natural hosts. There is currently only one species in this genus: the type species Escherichia virus N4.

Escherichia virus N4 is the type species of this genus and was originally isolated from sewers in Genoa, Italy and infects Escherichia coli K-12. Recently, a number of genetically related phages were isolated, infecting Silicibacter and Sulfitobacter (DSS3ɸ2 and EE36ɸ1) as well as a number of Pseudomonas phages (LUZ7, LIT1 and PEV2)

Taxonomy
Group: dsDNA

Structure
The virus's virion have icosahedral (T=9) heads ~70 nm and short tails (10 nm), and contain short fibers originating from the junction between the head and tail. All the phages of this genus are strictly virulent and contain a linear dsDNA genome (with terminal repeats) in the range of 70-75kb.

Life cycle
Viral replication is cytoplasmic. Entry into the host cell is achieved by adsorption into the host cell. Dna templated transcription is the method of transcription. Bacteria serve as the natural host. Transmission routes are passive diffusion.

RNA polymerases
A remarkable feature of this clade of phages is the use of three distinct RNA polymerases during its infection cycle. A giant virion-encapsulated RNAP polymerase which is co-injected (early transcription), a heterodimeric phage RNA polymerase (middle region) and the host RNA polymerase (recognizes late promoters).

References

External links
 Viralzone: N4likevirus
 ICTV

Podoviridae
Virus genera